

Arthropods

Newly named insects

Mollusca

Newly named bivalves

Archosauromorphs

Newly named dinosaurs
Data courtesy of George Olshevsky's dinosaur genera list.

Newly named birds

Pterosaurs

New taxa

Plesiosaurs

New taxa

References

 
Paleontology